Where's Wally?: The Incredible Paper Chase (known in the U.S. as Where's Waldo?: The Incredible Paper Chase) is the seventh book in the Where's Wally? book series. The book was released in 2009, and is the latest book in the series. It features Wally, Woof, Wenda, Wizard Whitebeard, and Odlaw travelling through different scenes. The reader's goal is to find Wally's key, Woof's bone, Wenda's camera, Wizard Whitebeard's scroll, Odlaw's binoculars, and a missing piece of paper in each scene. In addition to finding the characters, The Incredible Paper Chase, as with Where's Wally? The Great Picture Hunt!, has other challenges like "spot-the-differences" scenes. Some of the characters and scenes have appeared in one of the earlier Where's Wally? spin-off books.

The book was originally released in a larger hardback book without the numbering system continuing on the cover with a '7'. It could be found, however, in the top left corner of the back cover. The 7 was included in the paperback edition, on the cover.

Scenes
 Castle Siege
 The Jurassic Games
 Picture This
 The Great Retreat
 Muddy Swampy Jungle Game
 What a Dog Fight!
 The Beat of the Drums
 The Great Escape
 The Enormous Party
 Where's Wally? The Incredible Paper Chase Checklist
 The Wacky Wally Circus Show

Notes

Where's Wally? books
Little, Brown and Company books
2009 children's books